Gairatganj is a census town in Raisen district in the state of Madhya Pradesh, India.

Demographics

As of the 2011 Census of India, Gairatganj had a population of 18,090. Males constitute 53% of the population and females 47%. Gairatganj has an average literacy rate of 71%, higher than the national average of 59.5%: male literacy is 76%, and female literacy is 65%. In Gairatganj, 25% of the population is under 5 years of age.

References

Cities and towns in Raisen district
Raisen